Noah Smith is an American blogger, journalist, and commentator on economics and current events. Smith obtained his doctorate in Economics from the University of Michigan in 2012 and was an assistant professor of Behavioral Finance at Stony Brook University. Smith writes for his own Substack blog, Noahpinion, and has also written for publications including Bloomberg, Quartz, Associated Press, Business Insider, and The Atlantic. Smith left Bloomberg in 2021 to fully focus on his current blog.

Graduate school 
Smith originally studied physics and graduated with a B.S. from Stanford University in 2003. After Stanford, Smith changed to Economics with the intention of eventually becoming an economic commentator and pundit. Smith started blogging in grad school, on Google's Blogger platform, inspired by his original goal, as well as feeling disaffected with studying macroeconomics. He attributes the blog's early success to established pundits and economists such as Mark Thoma and Paul Krugman reading and referencing it. During this time, Smith also wrote articles for Quartz, with his advisor, Miles Kimball. After finishing graduate school, Smith began teaching as an assistant professor at Stony Brook University.

Career 
While working as an assistant professor of Finance in New York, Smith was reached out to by Bloomberg with an offer to work full-time as an opinion columnist. His first column, "Why is Econ 101 so bad?", appeared on May 22, 2014. After waiting a year and working part-time, Smith accepted the offer in 2016, left Stony Brook University, and moved to California. He continued to blog while working as a columnist and in 2020, moved his blog from Blogger to Substack. Smith's online presence grew through Substack and Twitter and in 2021, he left Bloomberg Business week to fully dedicate his time to his blog.

Political views 
Noah Smith is broadly considered by others to be on the left, or a liberal. Contemporaries often group Smith in with other liberal economists such as Krugman, who has also written in support of some of Smith's views. He has written articles or columns that demonstrate a left leaning perspective, expressing support for affordable healthcare reform, mass expansion of public transit, green energy, immigration reform, labor unions, and YIMBY positions. Smith has appeared on the Neoliberal Project's podcast multiple times and was labeled the "Chief Neoliberal Shill" by the group in 2018. Smith aligns himself with liberal commentators and has written in dissent about conservative slants in the economics industry and profession. Smith has expressed disagreements with socialism and communism as well as the degrowth movement, or a post growth world. He has views on the education of economics, particularly microeconomics, stating that more of the focus of economics education should be data driven, and less of a theory emphasis. In a similar vein, he has criticized macroeconomics for being too theory focused, despite it being the most popular field.  He has expressed disagreements with Modern Monetary Theory.

References

External links 
Noah Smith's blog: Noahpinion

Noah Smith's Twitter

Bloomberg archive

Living people
21st-century American economists
American male journalists
University of Michigan alumni
Stony Brook University faculty
American male bloggers
American political writers
American economics writers
21st-century American non-fiction writers
American bloggers
Opinion journalists
21st-century American journalists

Year of birth missing (living people)